A real estate investment association (REIA) is a trade organization for real estate investors.  The purpose of a REIA is to provide networking opportunities, educational events, to advocate on behalf of the industry,  REIAs range from small, informal groups to more organized and larger groups with hundreds or even thousands of members.

References

Real estate investing